The Dance Goes On (German: Der Tanz geht weiter) is a 1930 American crime film directed by William Dieterle and starring Dieterle, Lissy Arna and Anton Pointner. It was made by Warner Brothers as the German-language version of their film Those Who Dance.

Cast
 William Dieterle as Fred Hogan  
 Lissy Arna as Elly  
 Anton Pointner as Joe  
 Carla Bartheel as Kitty, Joes Freundin  
 Werner Klingler as Tim, Ellys Bruder  
 John Reinhardt as Pat Hogan  
 Philipp Lothar Mayring as Benson

References

Bibliography
 Reimer, Robert C. & Reimer, Carol J. The A to Z of German Cinema. Scarecrow Press, 2010.

External links

1930 films
1930 crime films
American black-and-white films
American crime films
Films directed by William Dieterle
1930s German-language films
American multilingual films
Warner Bros. films
1930 multilingual films
1930s American films